The use of music on FOX drama The O.C. gained much acclaim. Show creator Josh Schwartz wanted music to be a "character on the show" and the experienced Alexandra Patsavas took the role of music supervisor. The show's orchestral music was composed by Christopher Tyng. The series is credited with showcasing many artists, and helping to elevate them in the music business. Many acts made guest appearances on the show, and others premiered their new singles in episodes. Six official soundtrack albums were released, and these were compilations of predominantly indie music.

History

Alexandra Patsavas, who had previously worked on shows including Roswell and Carnivàle, was appointed as music supervisor on The O.C.. Patsavas worked alongside creator Josh Schwartz, in selecting the music to be used. In an interview with IGN, Schwartz said that he had "always intended that music be a character on the show" and music was selected in two ways: either it was written into the script or it was selected to suit a scene. Patsavas stated that Schwartz scripted a lot of the music, with some songs being selected before she saw the episode script. For example, for an episode Schwartz had scripted a cover of "Champagne Supernova", got permission from Oasis and collaborated with band Matt Pond PA to write a cover of it for the show. On another occasion Schwartz went to Phantom Planet and asked for a mellow version of California. 
The reason "California" became the theme to show was because "Josh Schwartz loved the way it worked in a scene in the pilot." At other times they watch the episodes' editors cut and pitch song ideas for specific scenes. Each week Patsavas created a compilation from the new releases sent into the producers, and at times they were being "sent around 400 or 500 CD's a week". Fox and The O.C. made indie rock a "main focus of the series" and also its marketing plan. Christopher Tyng, who composed the theme for Futurama, composed the show's orchestral music which included the ending theme.

Shawn Rogers, Sub Pop's creative director of film and TV licensing, said that the show's choice of music was to "support bands and the style of music that they've been following" adding that artists were willing because "it pays well in comparison to what most indie bands make touring". However, Jimmy Tamborello, producer for The Postal Service, commented that it was just because "we're cheaper". Although exact figures are not known, Les Watkins, a music lawyer from Los Angeles, estimated that "a song by an emerging artist could fetch up to $20,000 or $30,000" and this is jointly split between record label and the songwriter/publisher. He stated that "once lawyers, managers, and the rest of the entourage get their piece, the artist may only see a fraction of the payout."

Artist performances

The Bait Shop

The Bait Shop is introduced in the second season as a new night club and concert venue on the pier. It was an undeniable reference to Beverly Hills, 90210's "Peach Pit". New character Alex works there and Schwartz described her as "our 'Nat', if you will." Schwartz described the venue:

Basically the Bait Shop is a little bit modeled after clubs like The Troubadour in Los Angeles or CBGB in New York, meaning it's kind of got more of a down, kind of older feel. It's on the pier and the idea was that maybe, once upon a time, it was an actual bait shop and now it's been converted into this rock club. I think it's really cool. It's got a lot of texture to it. It's got a lot of grit to it. It's been a great set for us and it's a great place for the kids to hang out. Because it's pier-adjacent, we get to go out there and shoot out by the water at night, too. I think it's just going to be a real iconic set for the show."

The actual filming location was the northeast corner of Redondo Beach pier.

Guest appearances

Rooney were the first act to perform on the show when the adolescents go to a concert as part of the episode "The Third Wheel". For the first-season finale, singer Jem performed a cover of Paul McCartney's "Maybe I'm Amazed". For the second season, a club called the Bait Shop was introduced, and early on in the season the bands The Walkmen, The Killers, and Modest Mouse all featured on the show playing at the club. Although not strictly playing himself, actor Peter Gallagher (as Sandy Cohen) had previously sung on Broadway and in the episode "The Power of Love" he serenades his wife Kirsten by singing a cover of Solomon Burke's "Don't Give Up on Me" at The Bait Shop. Other artists to perform at the club that season were The Thrills, Rachael Yamagata, and Death Cab for Cutie. In the episode "The Return of the Nana", Seth and Ryan visit Miami, and end up at a spring break style party where rapper T.I. guest stars as himself. For the third season, The Subways, Tom Vek, and Cobra Verde all made guest appearances performing in The Bait Shop.

Premieres
In addition to having guest artists perform on the show, it also premiered many new music tracks: The Beastie Boys single "Ch-Check It Out" debuted on the show in the episode "The Strip" that aired April 28, 2004. During the second season, U2 debuted their song "Sometimes You Can't Make It On Your Own" at the end of an episode on December 2, 2004. Gwen Stefani debuted her single "Cool" in an episode on December 9, 2004. In promoting his new album, Guero, Beck debuted five tracks from the album on March 10, 2005, with that week's installment being dubbed a "Beckisode" by the media. Another music premiere was Coldplay's song "Fix You", which debuted on May 12, 2005 in the final scene of the episode in which characters find out Caleb had a fatal heart attack. Imogen Heap, a former member of Frou Frou, had her new single debut on the show on May 19, 2005 – "Hide and Seek" featured twice in the episode "The Dearly Beloved". The single "Turn on Me" from band The Shins was first played in "The French Connection" on January 11, 2007.

Reception

The show was heavily praised for its music. The New York Times described Schwartz as "the Shiva of contemporary music" and IGN described Patsavas as a "consummate tastemaker" for the show. Chris Carle from IGN described the show as "a staging area for quality music", and Ben Spier from Entertainment Weekly described the show as a "mixtaper's dream" Catherine Elsworth of The Daily Telegraph described the events of The O.C. as being set "to a scrupulously hip soundtrack" and in another article stated that a "vital ingredient of his winning formula is the soundtrack, which draws on a broad range of modern alternative rock". Emily Zemler of PopMatters.com commented that the "writers seem to have impressive musical taste" and Barnes & Noble said that there was "probably no other show on television today where music is as important as it is on FOX's hit drama The O.C." Rolling Stone commented that the soundtrack was the reason people kept watching the show. However, when the show premiered U2's single "Sometimes You Can't Make It on Your Own" Karyn L. Barr from Entertainment Weekly stated that the show that dedicated time to indie bands was "selling out." The Bait Shop inspired a club night at Barfly in Cardiff, featuring music similar to that featured on the show,
but Noah Davis of PopMatters.com criticised the show for its "plots [that] were largely replaced by the gang's countless trips to the Bait Shop"

Artist promotion

Throughout the show, Death Cab for Cutie have "occupied a minor role on The O.C. as Seth Cohen's favorite band." Amy Phillips of Willamette Week described the band, within the context of the show, as follows. "Death Cab for Cutie is Seth Cohen's favorite band. He's got a Death Cab poster on his bedroom wall, plays Death Cab music in the car, gives Death Cab CDs to girls he likes." She also added at the time that "the more popular the character has become, the more fans the band has gained". Talking about their exposure on the show, Death Cab bass player Nick Harmer said that "there's really no other shows on television right now, other than 'The O.C.' that's really kind of showcasing bands in such a straightforward way." In 2004, the band's exposure on the show helped them get signed to Atlantic Records.

Hamilton Leithauser vocalist for The Walkmen said he considered "television performances as a solid, if ephemeral, means of promotion", but not all bands were eager to release their music for television shows. James Mercer, frontman for The Shins noted "that artists lose creative control" in the way that a song is interpreted, when the music is set to a particular scene. Additionally, fans and critics have stated that such appearances and mass marketing techniques are creating sell-outs. Indie band Clap Your Hands Say Yeah were asked to perform on the show, but they turned it down because they were worried that it could diminish their credibility. Frontman Alec Ounsworth said "I don't like the idea of being overexposed", adding that it was analogous to the fact that "Vincent van Gogh never sold a painting, and he was perfectly content".

However, it was a successful method of promotion. Rooney experienced a "200 percent increase in sales" after being featured on the show. When "Youth Group, recorded a just-for-The-O.C. cover of "Forever Young" [the song] registered more than 5,000 iTunes downloads its first week" The Daily Telegraph stated that indie duo Viva Voce had "their profile sent through the roof with a guest slot on the soundtrack to teens-in-trouble TV drama The O.C.". Imogen Heap became "a household name stateside." The series was "responsible for 7 Days in Memphis, the debut solo album from Peter Gallagher" as well as "help[ing] launch The Killers to mass mainstream success"

Music from The O.C.

The O.C. released six official soundtracks:
Music From The O.C.: Mix 1
Music From The O.C.: Mix 2
Music From The O.C.: Mix 3 – Have a Very Merry Chrismukkah
Music From The O.C.: Mix 4
Music From The O.C.: Mix 5
Music From The O.C.: Mix 6 – Covering Our Tracks

Patsavas, who was involved in selecting tracks the mixes, described the CDs as "not only a stand-alone piece but also as a companion to the show." Tammy La Gorce of Amazon.com described Mix 1 as having "moments of subtle exceptionality until the end, when things get really good", Mix 2 as a "collection that would slip effortlessly into any hipster's car CD player for its left of the dial leanings", and Mix 3 as being a "modern, cynical, but likeably wide-eyed antidote to the heap of jingle-bell-heavy offerings" Mario Cuellar from The Eastener also commented that Mix 2 has "music for everyone" Chris Carle of IGN commented that Mix 4 is "shorter than the rest, which is a little disappointing, but almost all of the tracks deliver". Elisabeth Vincentelli of Amazon.com commented that Mix 5'''s tracks "aren't innovative, but they are remarkably easy to like--even love" Pitchfork Media described Mix 6'' as a "collection of 12 covers, performed by B- and C-list artists" but Allmusic said that the "concept [of a cover album] could have resulted in a lot of cookie-cutter, indie rock karaoke, but most of these covers are creative, and occasionally, they're inspired".

Charts

Certifications

List of songs featured on The O.C.

References
General

Specific

The O.C.
OC